Armin Gigović (born 6 April 2002) is a Swedish professional footballer who plays as a central midfielder or defensive midfielder for FC Midtjylland. He is also under contract with Russian club Rostov, but that contract is suspended.

Club career

Early career 
Gigović started his football career in Landskrona BoIS. When he 15 years old he moved to the rival club Helsingborgs IF and played in the youth teams.

Helsingborgs IF 
In the beginning Gigović played for the academy in HIF and in the summer 2018 he played SM for 16 year olds in Gothenburg, which was arranged by Gothia Cup. Almost exactly one year later, on 15 July 2019 he made his debut for the senior Helsingborgs IF team.  He got subbed in at the 75th minute for David Boysen, and HIF won the match against IK Sirius with 1–0. In August 2019 Armin extended his contract with HIF until the end of 2021. Already back then there was a big interest from other clubs in Europe about him, among them Genoa, Wolves, CSKA Moscow and Amiens.

On 15 October 2020, the Swedish newspaper Sport Expressen revealed that Gigović and Pontus Almqvist were going to the Russian club Rostov. Later that evening the transfer got confirmed from Helsingborgs IF and Rostov.

Rostov 
On 15 October 2020, Gigović signed a five-year contract with Russian Premier League club Rostov.

Return to Helsingborgs IF
On 7 March 2022, FIFA introduced special regulations related to the Russian invasion of Ukraine. Those regulations allow foreign players in Russia to unilaterally temporarily suspend their contracts with their Russian clubs until the end of the 2021–22 season and join clubs outside of Russia until that date. On 31 March 2022, Gigović used that rule to return to Helsingborgs IF until the end of June 2022. On 1 July 2022, the loan was extended until 31 August 2022.

OB
On 31 August 2022 it was confirmed that Gigović had joined Danish Superliga club OB on a free transfer, after his deal with Russian FC Rostov had been suspended due to the war in Ukraine. Gigović signed a deal for the rest of 2022 with the Danish club.

FC Midtjylland
On 15 January 2023 it was confirmed that Gigović had joined Danish Superliga club FC Midtjylland on a loan deal for 6 months until the end of the 22/23 season.

International career 
Gigović made his full international debut for Sweden on 12 January 2023 in a friendly 2–1 win against Iceland, playing for 77 minutes before being replaced by Samuel Gustafson.

Personal life
Gigović's family hails from Jelah near Tešanj, Bosnia and Herzegovina. His father Almir is a former footballer from Šiprage in the Kotor Varoš municipality. His mother Senada hails from Tutin in the Serbian region of Sandžak.

On 24 August 2020, Armin Gigović tested positive for COVID-19.

Career statistics

Club

International

References

External links
 
 Svensk Fotboll Profile

2002 births
Living people
Sportspeople from Lund
Swedish footballers
Swedish expatriate footballers
Sweden youth international footballers
Sweden under-21 international footballers
Swedish people of Bosnia and Herzegovina descent
Association football midfielders
Helsingborgs IF players
FC Rostov players
Odense Boldklub players
FC Midtjylland players
Allsvenskan players
Russian Premier League players
Danish Superliga players
Swedish expatriate sportspeople in Russia
Swedish expatriate sportspeople in Denmark
Expatriate footballers in Russia
Expatriate men's footballers in Denmark